Sumac may refer to:
Soumak rug (also spelt Soumakh, Sumak, Sumac, or Soumac), a type of weft-wrapped flatwoven Oriental rug
Sumac (band), a 2010s American/Canadian rock band
Sumac, any one of approximately 250 species of flowering plants in the genus Rhus and related genera
A spice made from the plant Rhus coriaria
Poison sumac, Toxicodendron vernix (formerly classified as Rhus vernix)
Sumach, Missouri, a community in the United States
Yma Sumac, a Peruvian folk and Latin singer
Operation Sumac, a series of military exercises conducted by the U.S. Navy
Sumac Centre, an independent community and social centre in Nottingham, UK
Stanford University Mathematics Camp, a competitive summer mathematics program for rising high school juniors and seniors